Shine True is a documentary series, premiering March 22, 2021 on OutTV in Canada, and Fuse in the United States. Originally announced in 2019 with the working title Clothes Minded, the series celebrates the trans and gender non-conforming community by helping them overcome dysphoria and anxiety, and getting them to a place where they can freely and finally present the way they feel.

The series is co-hosted by musician, activist and life coach Lucas Silveira, and model, artist and photographer Richie Shazam.

The series is a coproduction of OutTV, Fuse Media and Vice Media.

Cast
 Azul (they/them)
 Fran (they/them)
 Kain (they/he/she)
 Juan (they/them/he/him)
 Juan (they/them/he/him)
 LaDon (he/him/she/her)
 Prism (they/them)
 Ronnie (they/them)
 T (he/him/they/them)

References

2021 American television series debuts
2021 Canadian television series debuts
2020s American reality television series
2020s Canadian reality television series
2020s American LGBT-related television series
2020s Canadian LGBT-related television series
2020s LGBT-related reality television series
Fuse (TV channel) original programming
OutTV (Canadian TV channel) original programming
Makeover reality television series
Transgender-related television shows
Canadian LGBT-related reality television series
American LGBT-related reality television series